Pett Bottom may refer to:

 Pett Bottom (Brabourne), a place in the parish of Brabourne in the Borough of Ashford, Kent, UK; see 
 Pett Bottom (Canterbury), a settlement near Lower Hardres in the City of Canterbury, Kent, UK
 a fictional place based of Pert Bottom, Canterbury referenced in Ian Fleming's novel You Only Live Twice